Pramadea is a genus of moths of the family Crambidae.

Species
Pramadea crotonalis (Walker, 1859)
Pramadea denticulata Moore, 1888
Pramadea lunalis (Guenée, 1854)
Pramadea ovialis (Walker, 1859)

Taxonomy
The genus was formerly listed as a synonym of Syllepte, but reinstated as a valid genus by Kirti and Gill in 2004.

References

External links
Natural History Museum Lepidoptera genus database

Spilomelinae
Crambidae genera
Taxa named by Frederic Moore